Constantin Eftimescu (15 June 1952 – 18 June 2022) was a Romanian footballer who played as a goalkeeper.

Career
He was part of Dinamo București's team that reached the semi-finals in the 1983–84 European Cup season. He was hospitalized at the Military Hospital in Bucharest, in the Intensive Care Unit and died on June 18, 2022.

Honours
Dinamo București
Divizia A: 1972–73, 1976–77, 1981–82, 1982–83, 1983–84
Cupa României: 1981–82, 1983–84
Victoria București
Divizia B: 1984–85

Notes

References

1952 births
2022 deaths
Footballers from Bucharest
Romanian footballers
Association football goalkeepers
Liga I players
Liga II players
FC Dinamo București players
Victoria București players
FC Delta Dobrogea Tulcea players
FCM Târgoviște players
Chimia Râmnicu Vâlcea players